Louis A. Sebert (born December 17, 1935) is an American former politician. He served in the South Dakota House of Representatives from 1999 to 2006.

References

1935 births
Living people
People from Walworth County, South Dakota
Businesspeople from South Dakota
Republican Party members of the South Dakota House of Representatives